The House Select Committee on the Modernization of Congress was a select committee that was established by H.Res. 6 on January 4, 2019, and was tasked to investigate, study, make findings, hold public hearings, and develop recommendations to make Congress more effective, efficient, and transparent. The Select Committee is a bipartisan committee, with an equal number of Republican and Democratic members.

H.Res. 6, which was introduced by Rep. Steny Hoyer, was approved by an overwhelming majority of 418–12. Following the installation of the inaugural 12 members, interest was expressed from the left-leaning Demand Progress, the Republican-aligned Congressional Institute and the nonaligned Bipartisan Policy Center. For its part, Roll Call commented that:

The Select Committee, was originally set to expire in February 2020; however, the House voted on November 14, 2019, to extend the committee's work to the end of the 116th Congress. On January 4, 2021, the House once again officially reauthorized the Select Committee for the 117th Congress. 

Although the Select Committee does not have legislative jurisdiction, it has regularly released recommendations to the House. On December 10, 2019, the Select Committee members introduced H.Res.756 which incorporates 29 of the recommendations passed by the Select Committee to improve transparency, accessibility and communication throughout the House. The resolution was passed with a 395–13 vote.

Members, 117th Congress

Historical committee rosters

116th Congress

References

External links
 Archived version of the now-defunct official website
 Committee activity on Congress.gov
 Committee hearings on C-SPAN:
 116th Congress
 117th Congress
 Committee page on USGPO

Modernization of Congress
Modernization of Congress